Brigida Bianchi (1613–1703) was an Italian stage actress.

She was an actress in the Royal Italian court theatre in Paris between 1640 and 1660 and was a favorite of Anne of Austria.

Works 
 L'inganno fortunato, overo l'amata aborrita,comedia bellissima transportata dallo spagnuolo con alcune poesie musicali composte in diversi tempi (Paris, 1659), play
 I rifiuti di Pindo (Paris 1666), composition

References 

1613 births
1703 deaths
17th-century Italian actresses
Italian stage actresses
French courtiers
17th-century Italian composers
17th-century classical composers
Italian women composers
17th-century women composers
Court of Louis XIII
Court of Louis XIV